Hall Street School is located in Monroe Township, Gloucester County, New Jersey, United States. The school was built in 1878 and was added to the National Register of Historic Places on September 27, 2006.  It was moved from its original location to South Main Street.

See also
National Register of Historic Places listings in Gloucester County, New Jersey

References

Defunct schools in New Jersey
Monroe Township, Gloucester County, New Jersey
School buildings on the National Register of Historic Places in New Jersey
School buildings completed in 1887
Schools in Gloucester County, New Jersey
National Register of Historic Places in Gloucester County, New Jersey
New Jersey Register of Historic Places